MFG in Minnesota is a live album by multi-instrumentalist and composer Joe McPhee, recorded in 1978 and first released on the Swiss HatHut label in 1979.

Reception

Allmusic gave the album 2 stars stating "One of the dangers in such associations when dealing with a musician of McPhee's caliber, however, is that his companions won't quite measure up, which is often the case here. The effort is certainly there and the results aren't "bad" by any means, but there is a certain lackluster quality where one gets the sense that any forward progress is being provided by McPhee, with the others straining to keep up".

Track listing 
All compositions by Joe McPhee, Milo Fine and Steve Gnitka
 "Part IB" - 17:05
 "Part IC" - 8:39
 "Part IIA" - 5:54
 "Part IIB" - 18:14
 "Part IIC" - 11:03
 "Part IID" - 5:52

Personnel 
Joe McPhee - tenor saxophone, soprano saxophone, pocket cornet
Milo Fine - piano, prepared piano, clavinet, drums
Steve Gnitka - guitar

References 

Joe McPhee live albums
1979 live albums
Hathut Records live albums